The Western tarnished plant bug (Lygus hesperus) is a serious pest of cotton, strawberries, and seed crops such as alfalfa. In the state of California alone the bug causes US$30 million in damage to cotton plants each year, and at least US$40 million in losses to the state's strawberry industry.

Hosts 
Strawberry in California. See also Western Tarnished Plant Bug in California.

References 

Lygus
Agricultural pest insects
Insects described in 1917